A Volume corrector is a device for calculating, summing and determining an increase of gas volume measured by the gas meter in terms equivalent to the base terms. It uses the gas volume measured by the gas meter in measuring conditions and other parameters such as gas pressure and temperature.
It is used for the settlement of trade wholesale gas.

References 

European standard EN 12405-1:2005, 

Measuring instruments